The Bowling, Billiard and Boules Federation of the Islamic Republic of Iran (BBFIR), more commonly known as the Iran Bowling and Cue Sports Federation (IranBCS) is the governing body in Iran of bowling and cue sports (including snooker, carom billiards and pool).  Founded in 2000, the organization was originally known as the Iran Bowling and Billiards Federation (IBBF).

BBFIR is member of the Iran National Olympic Committee, and is also the national affiliate of Fédération Internationale des Quilleurs, World Tenpin Bowling Association, the Asian Confederation of Billiard Sports (regional division of the World Confederation of Billiards Sports), International Billiards and Snooker Federation and World Pool-Billiard Association, and Asian Pocket Billiard Union as the governing body of these sports in Iran.

References

External links
 Official website 

Bowling